Gimhae National Museum is a national museum located in Gimhae, South Gyeongsang Province, South Korea. It opened on July 29, 1998, with the aim to compile available cultural properties of Gaya, one of ancient states in Korea.

See also
List of museums in South Korea
National museum

References

External links
 Gimhae National Museum Official Site

National museums of South Korea
Buildings and structures in Gimhae
Museums in South Gyeongsang Province
Museums established in 1998